Uncle Dick's Darling is a 1920 British silent comedy film directed by Fred Paul and starring George Bellamy, Athalie Davis and Humberston Wright.

Cast
 George Bellamy as Uncle Dick  
 Athalie Davis as Mary  
 Humberston Wright as Chevenix  
 Ronald Power as Mr. Lorimer  
 Sydney Folker
 Frank Dane 
 Gordon Craig

References

Bibliography
 Low, Rachael. History of the British Film, 1918-1929. George Allen & Unwin, 1971.

External links
 

1920 films
1920 comedy films
British comedy films
British silent feature films
Films directed by Fred Paul
British black-and-white films
1920s English-language films
1920s British films
Silent comedy films